Attention, the Kids Are Watching  (also known as Careful, The Children Are Watching) is a 1978 French drama film starring Alain Delon.

Plot
In a small town by the sea, a group of siblings aged 5 to 13 - Marlene, Dimitri, Marc (known as Boule) and Laetitia - spend most of their days watching television shows while under care of a Spanish nanny, who they call "Avocados", and dislike.

One day they all go to the beach. The nanny falls asleep on a rubber raft while sunbathing on the sand. For a joke, they put her out to sea. She panics when she wakes up and ends up drowning. The kids do try to save her, but when they fail they decide to not to report it and use the opportunity to live as they wish.

A man arrives who saw the nanny drown. He blackmails the children. They decide to kill him.

Cast
 Alain Delon : The Man
 Sophie Renoir : Marlène
 Richard Constantini : Dimitri
 Thierry Turchet : Boule
 Tiphaine Leroux : Laetitia
 Adelita Requena : Avocados
 Henri Vilbert : Le gardien
 Françoise Brion : Mademoiselle Millard
 Danielle Volle : La mère
 Marco Perrin : Gendarme
 Ticky Holgado : Gendarme
 François Cadet : Le pompiste
 Paul Crauchet : l'ami pecheur
 Michel Fortin : le chauffeur du bus scolaire

Production
The film was based on the novel The Children Are Watching by Charles Koenig and Peter Dixon.

In June 1969 producer Ronald Kahn announced he had purchased the film rights and hired Koenig and Dixon to write a script. He said the film was "a strong comment about an age in which television can take over the minds of the young." This version of the film was not made.

Film rights were purchased by the production company of Alain Delon. However the movie was a box office disappointment.

References

External links

1978 films
Films produced by Alain Delon
French drama films
Films based on American novels
1970s French-language films
1970s French films